Tiananmen Square or Tian'anmen Square (天安门广场; Pinyin: Tiān'ānmén Guǎngchǎng; Wade–Giles: Tʻien1-an1-mên2 Kuang3-chʻang3) is a city square in the city center of Beijing, China, named after the eponymous Tiananmen ("Gate of Heavenly Peace") located to its north, which separates it from the Forbidden City. The square contains the Monument to the People's Heroes, the Great Hall of the People, the National Museum of China, and the Mausoleum of Mao Zedong. Mao Zedong proclaimed the founding of the People's Republic of China in the square on October 1, 1949; the anniversary of this event is still observed there. The size of Tiananmen Square is 765 x 282 meters (215,730 m2 or 53.31 acres). It has great cultural significance as it was the site of several important events in Chinese history.

Outside China, the square is best known for the 1989 protests and massacre that ended with a military crackdown, which is also known as the Tiananmen Square Massacre or the June Fourth Massacre.

History

The Tiananmen ("Gate of Heavenly Peace"), a gate in the wall of the Imperial City, was built in 1417 during the Ming dynasty. In the 17th century, fighting between Li Zicheng's rebel forces and the forces of the Manchu-led Qing dynasty caused heavy damage to, or even destroyed, the gate. Tiananmen Square was designed and built in 1651, and was enlarged fourfold in the 1950s.

The gate historically known as the "Great Ming Gate", the southern gate to the Imperial City stands near the center of the square. It was renamed the "Great Qing Gate" during the Qing dynasty, and the "Gate of China" during the Republican era. Unlike the other gates in Beijing, such as the Tiananmen and the Zhengyang Gate, this was a purely ceremonial gateway, with three arches but no ramparts, similar in style to the ceremonial gateways found in the Ming tombs. This gate had a special status as the "Gate of the Nation", as can be seen from its successive names. It normally remained closed, except when the emperor passed through. Commoner traffic was diverted to side gates at the western and eastern ends of the square, respectively. Because of this diversion in traffic, a busy marketplace, called "Chess Grid Streets", was developed in the large fenced square to the south of this gate.

In 1860, during the Second Opium War, when British and French troops occupied Beijing, they pitched camp near the gate and briefly considered burning down the gate and the Forbidden City. Ultimately, they decided to spare the Forbidden City and instead burn down the Old Summer Palace. The Xianfeng Emperor eventually agreed to let Western powers barrack troops – and later establish diplomatic missions – in the area, hence there was the Legation Quarter immediately to the east of the square. When the forces of the Eight-Nation Alliance besieged Beijing during the Boxer Rebellion in 1900, they badly damaged the office complexes and burnt down several ministries. After the Boxer Rebellion ended, the area became a space for the Eight-Nation Alliance to assemble their military forces.

In 1954, the Gate of China was demolished, allowing for the enlargement of the square. In November 1958, a major expansion of Tiananmen Square started, which was completed after only 11 months, in August 1959. This followed the vision of Mao Zedong to make the square the largest and most spectacular in the world, and intended to hold over 500,000 people. In that process, a large number of residential buildings and other structures have been demolished. On its southern edge, the Monument to the People's Heroes has been erected. Concomitantly, as part of the Ten Great Buildings constructed between 1958 and 1959 to commemorate the ten-year anniversary of the People's Republic of China (PRC), the Great Hall of the People and the Revolutionary History Museum (now the National Museum of China) were erected on the western and eastern sides of the square.

For the first decade of the PRC, each National Day (October 1) was marked by a large military parade in Tiananmen Square, in conscious emulation of the annual Soviet celebrations of the Bolshevik Revolution. After the disaster of the Great Leap Forward, the CCP decided to cut costs and have only smaller annual National Day celebrations in addition to a large celebration with a military parade every 10 years. However, the chaos of the Cultural Revolution almost prevented such an event from taking place on National Day, 1969, which did take place (parades were also held there in 1966 and 1970). Ten years later, in 1979, the CCP again decided against a large scale celebration, coming at a time when Deng Xiaoping was still consolidating power and China had suffered a rebuff in a border war with Vietnam early in the year. By 1984, with the situation much improved and stabilized, the PRC held a military parade for the first time since 1959. The aftermath of the Tiananmen Square massacre prevented any such activities in October 1989, but military parades have been held in 1999 and 2009, on the 50th and 60th anniversaries of the PRC's founding. On May 8, 2015, a military parade was also held to celebrate the 70th anniversary of the end of World War II.

In 1971, large portraits of Karl Marx, Friedrich Engels, Vladimir Lenin, Joseph Stalin, Sun Yat-sen, and Mao Zedong were erected in the square, painted by artist Ge Xiaoguang, who is also responsible for producing the famous portrait of Mao that hangs over the Gate of Heavenly Peace. In 1980, with the downgrading of political ideology following Mao's death, the portraits were taken down and thenceforth only brought out on Labor Day (May 1) and National Day. In 1988, the CCP leadership decided to display only the portraits of Sun and Mao on national holidays.

One year after Mao's death, a mausoleum was built near the site of the former Gate of China along the main north–south axis of the square. In connection with this project, the square was further increased in size to become fully rectangular and being able to accommodate 600,000 people.

The urban context of the square was altered in the 1990s with both the construction of National Grand Theater in its vicinity and the expansion of the National Museum.

Panorama

Configuration

Used as a venue for mass gatherings since its creation, its flatness is contrasted by both the 38-meter (125 ft)-high "Monument to the People's Heroes" and the "Mausoleum of Mao Zedong." The square lies between two ancient, massive gates: the Tiananmen to the north and the Zhengyangmen (better known as Qianmen) to the south. Along the west side of the square is the Great Hall of the People. Along the east side is the National Museum of China (dedicated to Chinese history predating 1919). Erected in 1989, Liberty, a statue representing the western icon holds her torch over the square. Chang'an Avenue, which is used for parades, lies between the Tian'anmen and the square. Trees line the east and west edges of the square, but the square itself is open, with neither trees nor benches. The square is lit with large lamp posts which are fitted with video cameras. It is heavily monitored by uniformed and plain-clothes police officers.

Events

Tiananmen Square has been the site of a number of political events and student protests.

Perhaps the most notable events that have occurred here were protests during the May Fourth Movement in 1919, the proclamation of the People's Republic of China by Mao Zedong on October 1, 1949, the Tiananmen Square protests in 1976 after the death of Zhou Enlai, and the Tiananmen Square protests of 1989 after the death of Hu Yaobang. The latter resulted in military suppression and the deaths of hundreds, if not thousands, of civilian protestors. One of the most famous images to come from these protests was of a man stood in front of a line of moving tanks and refusing to move, which was captured on Chang'an Avenue near the square.

Other notable events included annual mass military displays on each anniversary of the 1949 proclamation until October 1, 1959; the 1984 military parade for the 35th anniversary of the People's Republic of China which coincided with the ascendancy of Deng Xiaoping; military displays and parades on the 50th anniversary of the People's Republic of China in 1999; the Tiananmen Square self-immolation incident in 2001; military displays and parades on the 60th anniversary of the People's Republic of China in 2009, and an incident in 2013 involving a vehicle that plowed into pedestrians.

Access
The square, located in the city center, is readily accessible by public transport. Line 1 of the Beijing Subway has stops at Tiananmen West and Tiananmen East, respectively, to the northwest and northeast of the square on Chang'an Avenue. Line 2's Qianmen Station is directly south of the square.

City bus routes 1, 5, 10, 22, 52, 59, 82, 90, 99, 120, 126, 203, 205, 210 and 728 stop north of the square. 

Buses 2, 5, 7, 8, 9, 17, 20, 22, 44, 48, 53, 54, 59, 66, 67, 72, 82, 110, 120, 126, 301, 337, 608, 673, 726, 729, 901, 90, 特2, 特4 and 特7 stop to the south of the square.

The square is normally open to the public, but remains under heavy security. Before entry, visitors and their belongings are searched, a common practice at many Chinese tourist sites, although the square is somewhat unusual in that domestic visitors often have their identification documents checked and the purpose of their visit questioned. Both plain-clothes and uniformed police officers patrol the area. There are numerous fire extinguishers placed in the area to put out flames should a protester attempt self-immolation.

Gallery

References

External links

 

 
National symbols of the People's Republic of China
1415 establishments in Asia
15th-century establishments in China
Dongcheng District, Beijing
National squares
Squares in Beijing
Tourist attractions in Beijing